Palatals are consonants articulated with the body of the tongue raised against the hard palate (the middle part of the roof of the mouth). Consonants with the tip of the tongue curled back against the palate are called retroflex.

Characteristics
The most common type of palatal consonant is the extremely common approximant , which ranks as among the ten most common sounds in the world's languages. The nasal  is also common, occurring in around 35 percent of the world's languages, in most of which its equivalent obstruent is not the stop , but the affricate . Only a few languages in northern Eurasia, the Americas and central Africa contrast palatal stops with postalveolar affricates—as in Hungarian, Czech, Latvian, Macedonian, Slovak, Turkish and Albanian.

Consonants with other primary articulations may be palatalized, that is, accompanied by the raising of the tongue surface towards the hard palate. For example, English  (spelled sh) has such a palatal component, although its primary articulation involves the tip of the tongue and the upper gum (this type of articulation is called palatoalveolar).

In phonology, alveolo-palatal, palatoalveolar and palatovelar consonants are commonly grouped as palatals, since these categories rarely contrast with true palatals. Sometimes palatalized alveolars or dentals can be analyzed in this manner as well.

Distinction from alveolo-palatal, apical palatalized consonants and consonant clusters
Palatal consonants can be distinguished from apical palatalized consonants and consonant clusters of a consonant and the palatal approximant . The common laminal "palatalized" alveolars, which also contrast with palatals, have a rather unique place of articulation and should be called alveolo-palatal consonant. Palatal consonants have their primary articulation toward or in contact with the hard palate, whereas palatalized consonants have a primary articulation in some other area and a secondary articulation involving movement towards the hard palate. However, (post)palatal consonants in general do not contrast with palatalized velars, which in theory have slightly wider place of articulation than postpalatals.

Irish distinguishes the dorsal palatal nasal  (slender ng) from both the laminal alveolo-palatal nasal ("lenis")  (slender nn) and the apical palatalized alveolar nasal ("fortis")  (slender n), nonetheless most modern Irish speakers may either merge the latter two or depalatalize the apical palatalized consonant. So is the difference between the two Migueleño Chiquitano stops. In both languages alveolo-palatal consonants correspond to the palatalization or slender of alveolars while palatal consonants correspond to the palatalization or slender of velars.

Spanish marginally distinguishes palatal consonants from sequences of a dental and the palatal approximant, e.g. in lleísmo Spanish the laterals ll (/l̠ʲ/→ʎ) and ly (/lj/→lɟʝ), and for all Spanish speakers, in the case of nasals:
uñón  "large nail"
unión  "union"
So is the difference between Russian clusters ня and нъя (the Russian palatal approximant never becomes [ɟʝ]). However, phonetically speaking, the Spanish one is simultaneous alveolo-palatal and dento-alveolar or dento-alveolo-palatal while the Russian soft one is alveolopalatal laminal (except for /rʲ/ which is apical with a secondary articulation). Neither are true palatals like the Irish one.

Sometimes the term palatal is used imprecisely to mean "palatalized". Also, languages that have sequences of consonants and /j/, but no separate palatal or palatalized consonants (e.g. English), will often pronounce the sequence with /j/ as a single palatal or palatalized consonant. This is due to the principle of least effort and is an example of the general phenomenon of coarticulation.

Examples
For a table of examples of palatal  in the Romance languages, see .

See also
 Palatalization (phonetics)
 Palatalization (sound change)
 Place of articulation
 Index of phonetics articles

References

Place of articulation